The Endlose Treppe (meaning "Endless Steps" in German) is a sculpture made by the Swiss artist Max Bill in 1991 for the philosopher Ernst Bloch. It is made of North American granite. 

It stands near the Wilhelm-Hack-Museum in the city-center of Ludwigshafen am Rhein. According to the artist, the 19 winding steps of granite, which stand nearly 10 meters, are supposed to represent Ernst Bloch's "principle of hope".

External links 
Max Bill „Endlose Treppe (Monument für Ernst Bloch)“ - 1991 

German sculpture
Ludwigshafen
Stone sculptures in Germany
1991 sculptures
Granite sculptures
1991 establishments in Germany
Outdoor sculptures in Germany